Corey Schueneman (born September 2, 1995) is an American professional ice hockey defenseman currently playing for the Laval Rocket of the American Hockey League (AHL) while under contract to the Montreal Canadiens of the National Hockey League (NHL).

Playing career 
Schueneman played junior hockey in the United States Hockey League (USHL) with the Muskegon Lumberjacks and the Des Moines Buccaneers before committing to a collegiate career with the Western Michigan Broncos of the National Collegiate Hockey Conference (NCHC).

As an undrafted free agent, Schueneman following a four-year collegiate career and captaining the Broncos in his senior year, Schueneman was signed on an amateur try-out contract for the remainder of the 2018–19 season and also a one-year AHL contract for the following season with the Stockton Heat, the primary affiliate of the Calgary Flames, on March 22, 2019.

After splitting the 2019–20 season, with the Heat and the Kansas City Mavericks of the ECHL, Schueneman left the Heat as a free agent and was signed to a one-year AHL contract with the Laval Rocket on July 3, 2020.

In the following pandemic delayed 2020–21 season, Schueneman collected 7 points through his first 21 games with the Rocket before signing a one-year, two-way contract for the following season with the Rocket's NHL affiliate, the Montreal Canadiens, on April 2, 2021.

Schueneman began the  season with the Rocket before earning his first recall to the NHL on December 8, 2021. He was later returned to the AHL before earning a second recall and making his long-awaited NHL debut with the Canadiens, registering an assist in a 5–4 overtime defeat to the Tampa Bay Lightning on December 28, 2021. Continuing to split time between the Rocket and the Canadiens, he scored his first NHL goal in a March 17, 2022 game against the Dallas Stars. The goal was mistakenly announced in the arena as his second career goal, to which he quipped "I didn't hear it, but if I have another one there I'll gladly take it." He would indeed manage a second goal that season, as part of a 5–4 shootout victory against the Lighting on April 2.

The Canadiens signed Schueneman to a one-year, two-way contract on July 7, 2022.

Career statistics

Awards and honors

References

External links
 

1995 births
Living people
Des Moines Buccaneers players
Kansas City Mavericks players
Laval Rocket players
Montreal Canadiens players
Muskegon Lumberjacks players
Stockton Heat players
Undrafted National Hockey League players
Western Michigan Broncos men's ice hockey players